Vornado Realty Trust is a real estate investment trust formed in Maryland in 1982, with its primary office in New York City. The company invests in office buildings and street retail in Manhattan.

Investments
Notable properties owned by the company include:
 New York Marriott Marquis (Retail & signage)
 1540 Broadway (Retail & signage)
 510 Fifth Avenue (Retail)
 660 Fifth Avenue (Retail)
 770 Broadway
 888 Seventh Avenue
 Crowne Plaza Hotel, Times Square (Retail & office)
 Fuller Building
 Penn 1 (One Penn Plaza)
 Rego Center
 Hotel Pennsylvania, to be redeveloped into 15 Penn Plaza

The company also owns:
 70% of 555 California Street in San Francisco, California (30% is owned by affiliates of Donald Trump)
 70% of 1290 Avenues of the Americas in New York City (30% is owned by Donald Trump)
 Merchandise Mart in Chicago, Illinois
 32.4% of Alexander's, which owns 731 Lexington Avenue

History

Two Guys
The origins of the company can be traced back to the Two Guys discount store chain, founded in 1947 by brothers Sidney and Herbert Hubschman. In 1959, Two Guys acquired O. A. Sutton Corporation, manufacturers of the Vornado line of electric fans, and the company was renamed Vornado Inc.

By 1964, the company operated over 200 stores. In the 1970s, Vornado began divesting its retail operations. In 1978, the company sold 80 Two Guys locations in California.

In 1980, Interstate Properties Inc., a real estate development company controlled by Steven Roth, acquired an 18% stake in Vornado, since Roth became interested in the company's real estate holdings. In 1981, Interstate Properties took control of the firm after winning a proxy struggle against existing management and closed additional stores, reducing the number of stores in operation to 12.

Acquisition of Alexander's (1986–1995)
In 1986, Interstate Properties and Donald Trump each bought approximately 20% of Alexander's, a failing retailer whose real estate holdings included a store that occupied the entire block between East 58th and 59th streets and Lexington and Third Avenues in Manhattan.

In 1988, they each raised their stakes to 27% of the company, but Trump pledged his interest as collateral for a personal loan from Citicorp and in 1991, Trump was forced to turn over his holdings to Citibank.

In 1992, Roth and Alexander's creditors forced Alexander's into bankruptcy.

Alexander's emerged from bankruptcy in 1993 as a real estate investment trust. That same year, Vornado Inc. was converted into a REIT, Vornado Realty Trust. In 1995, Vornado bought Citicorp's interest in Alexander's.

Vornado Air licensing deal (1989)
In 1989, the Vornado name was licensed to Vornado Air, LLC, a new company formed to manufacture heating and cooling equipment. Outside of the brand licensing agreement, the Trust has no modern relation to Vornado Air, LLC.

Acquisition of properties from Bernard H. Mendik (1997)
In April 1997, the company acquired a company owned by Bernard H. Mendik in a $654 million stock transaction that added a large portfolio of office buildings in Manhattan to Vornado's assets. Mendik became co-chairman of Vornado until his resignation in October 1998.

World Trade Center lease (2001)
On February 15, 2001, the Port Authority announced that Vornado Realty Trust had won the bid for a 99-year lease for the World Trade Center, offering $3.25 billion. Silverstein Properties was outbid by $30 million by Vornado. However, Vornado balked over lease terms and possible tax liabilities. Silverstein signed a lease for the World Trade Center in April 2001, 5 months before the September 11 attacks.

2001–present
In 2001, the company acquired Charles E. Smith Commercial Realty, owner of a portfolio of assets primarily in Arlington, Virginia, in a $1.58 billion transaction. Robert H. Smith and Robert P. Kogod were added to the board of directors of Vornado.

In 2005, the company bought a 32.5% interest in Toys "R" Us. Toys "R" Us filed bankruptcy in 2018 and the investment was written off.

In 2013, Steven Roth replaced Michael D. Fascitelli as CEO of Vornado. Fascitelli had been CEO since 2009.

In 2015, the company spun off its interest in Urban Edge Properties, a spinoff consisting of its former retail holdings outside Manhattan, to its shareholders.

In 2017, the company merged its Charles E. Smith Companies subsidiary into the JBG Companies, forming JBG Smith.

References

External links

1982 establishments in New York (state)
Companies based in New York City
Companies listed on the New York Stock Exchange
Financial services companies established in 1982
Property management companies
Real estate companies established in 1982
Real estate investment trusts of the United States
Roth family